Tetraboric acid or pyroboric acid is a chemical compound with empirical formula .  It is a  colourless water-soluble solid formed by the dehydration or polymerization of boric acid.

Tetraboric acid is formally the parent acid of the tetraborate anion .

Preparation

 4  →  + 5

References 

Borates
Inorganic polymers